Petit Biscuit is the debut extended play (EP) by French DJ Petit Biscuit. It was released on 13 May 2016.

Background 
The EP features breezy vocal samples over guitars, keys and precessions.

Singles
"Open Your Eyes", exclusive song from the physical version of the EP was released as a promotional single on June 8, 2015. "Sunset Lover" was released as the lead single from the EP on June 25, 2015.

Reception 
Andrew Claps of YourEDM reviewed the EP, stating "His signature guitar based plucks accompanied by peaceful-like melodic vocal chops instills a state of nostalgia based relapses to a more blissful time."

Track listing

Charts

Certifications

References

2016 debut EPs
Petit Biscuit EPs
Albums produced by Petit Biscuit
Self-released EPs